The Philippine Science High School - Zamboanga Peninsula Region Campus (PSHS-ZPRC or PSHS-ZRC) is the 16th campus of the Philippine Science High School System located at Barangay Cogon, Dipolog. The school admits and grants scholarships to students who are gifted in science and mathematics. It caters to scholars from Zamboanga Peninsula Region which covers the provinces of Zamboanga del Norte, Zamboanga del Sur, and Zamboanga Sibugay.

History
PSHS-ZRC formally opened in 2015 with its temporary location inside Dipolog Sports Complex in Barangay Olingan. Its construction started at that time in Barangay Cogon, until its completion in late 2019.

References

External links
PSHS Zamboanga Peninsula Region Campus official website

Philippine Science High School System
Dipolog
Education in Dipolog
Schools in Zamboanga del Norte
2015 establishments in the Philippines
Educational institutions established in 2015